The 1977 Swiss Indoors was a men's tennis tournament played on indoor carpet courts at the St. Jakobshalle in Basel, Switzerland that was part of the 1977 Colgate-Palmolive Grand Prix. It was the ninth edition of the tournament and was held from 25 October through 30 October 1977. First-seeded Björn Borg won the singles title.

Finals

Singles
 Björn Borg defeated  John Lloyd 6–4, 6–2, 6–3
 It was Borg's 9th singles title of the year and the 28th of his career.

Doubles
 Mark Cox /  Buster Mottram defeated  John Feaver /  John James 7–5, 6–4, 6–3

References

External links
 Official website 
 ITF tournament edition details

Swiss Indoors
Swiss Indoors
indoor